Rasmus Videbæk (born 21 February 1973 in Copenhagen) is a Danish cinematographer.

Films 
The year of release and director of each film are indicated in parenthesis.
 Murk (2005 - Jannik Johansen)
 Ledsaget udgang (2007 - Erik Clausen)
 L'île aux sorciers (2007 - Nikolaj Arcel)
 Sandheden om mænd (2009 - Nikolaj Arcel)
 The Good Heart (2010 - Dagur Kári)
 Go with Me (2015 - Daniel Alfredson)
 The Dark Tower (2017 - Nikolaj Arcel)
 Thor: Ragnarok (2017 - Taika Waititi) (2 scenes)
 12 Strong (2018 - Nicolai Fuglsig)

References 
 *

Danish cinematographers
People from Copenhagen
Best Cinematographer Bodil Award winners
1973 births
Living people